Aargauer Zeitung (English: Aargauer Newspaper) is a Swiss German-language daily newspaper, published by AZ Medien Gruppe, Aarau, Aargau.

History and operations
[[File:Picswiss AG-26-22.jpg|thumb|Aargauer Zeitung'''s building in Aarau.]]Aagauer Zeitung was created in 1996 through the merger of the Aargauer Tagblatt and Badener Tagblatt newspapers.  The paper is edited in Aarau and Baden, Aargau. It produces several local editions, including under the titles Zofinger Tagblatt and Limmattaler Tagblatt.

Since January 2002, Mittelland Zeitung has been the common, core section of the newspaper as well as for newspapers Oltner Tagblatt and Solothurner Zeitung with a circulation of 200,000. .

In 1997 Aargauer Zeitung'' had a circulation of 118,578 copies.

See also
 List of newspapers in Switzerland

References

External links
 Official website

1996 establishments in Switzerland
Newspapers established in 1996
Daily newspapers published in Switzerland
German-language newspapers published in Switzerland
Mass media in Aargau